Chenoua, alternate spelling Shenwa, may refer to:

 Mount Chenoua, a mountain range in Algeria.
 The Chenouas, a Berber population inhabiting Algeria.
 The Shenwa language.